This is a list of well-known online encyclopedias—i.e., encyclopedias accessible or formerly accessible on the Internet.

The largest online encyclopedias are general reference works, though there are also many specialized ones. Some online encyclopedias are online editions of a print encyclopedia, such as Encyclopædia Britannica, whereas others are a separate enterprise entirely, such as Wikipedia.

General reference

Biography

Antiquities, arts, and literature

Regional interest

US-specific

Pop culture and fiction

Mathematics

Media

Philosophy

Politics, law, and history

Religion and theology

Science and technology

Life sciences

Medical

See also 
 Chinese encyclopedia
 List of academic databases and search engines
 List of blogs
 List of Danish online encyclopedic resources
 List of encyclopedias by branch of knowledge
 List of online databases
 List of online dictionaries
 List of multilingual MediaWiki sites
 List of wikis
 List of Wikipedias

References

External links 
 "Encyclopedic Knowledge, Then vs. Now", The New York Times, May 3, 2009

List
Online

encyclopedias

Wikipedia resources for researchers